Rittel is a German language habitational surname for someone who lived at a clearing. Notable people with the name include:
 Anton Rittel, Swiss footballer
 Ernst Rittel, Swiss footballer 
 Horst Rittel (1930–1990)), German design theorist and university professor

References 

German-language surnames
German toponymic surnames